Sukma Ayu (10 November 197925 September 2004) was an Indonesian actress and director who was most noted for playing Rohaye in the popular TV sitcom Kecil Kecil Jadi Manten. She was the daughter of writer and director Misbach Yusa Biran and actress Nani Widjaja.

Career
Sukma Ayu was the fourth child of popular Indonesian writer and director Misbach Yusa Biran and actress Nani Widjaja. Her sister Chaya Kamila is also a film actress. After appearing as a model in advertisements for Emeron, Jas Juice etc., Sukma made her debut in television with the serial Wajah Perempuan. Subsequently she also appeared in other television soaps such as Terpesona , Jin & Jun and Doa dan Anugerah. However it was the 2002 sitcom Kecil-Kecil Jadi Manten that gave her wide recognition, critical acclaim and popularity among the audience. She played the lead role in the show, a tomboy named Rohaye. She shaved her head and undertook football coaching for her role. The show is widely considered as one of the best Indonesian teenage sitcoms.

Death
On 9 April 2004, Sukma Ayu suffered a fall at Central Jakarta while enjoying the weekend with her colleagues and had to undergo a surgery for a cut caused to her harm due to the fall. However following the surgery, she developed a hematoma and slipped into coma. She remained in coma for 5 months, and died at her residence in Sentul, Babakan Madang, on 25 September 2004, due to a heart attack at the age of 24. She was buried at TPU Sukma Stone Tread, Ciomas, Bogor.

Television
 Wajah Perempuan
Terpesona
Jin & Jun
Doa dan Anugerah
Tujuh Tanda Cinta
Kecil-Kecil Jadi Manten
Norak Tapi Beken

References

1979 births
2005 deaths
Indonesian actresses
Accidental deaths in Indonesia
Indonesian television actresses
Accidental deaths from falls